The Rex Foundation was created by "members of the Grateful Dead and Friends" in 1983 as a charitable non-profit organization to "proactively provide extensive community support to creative endeavors in the arts, sciences, and education." The organization is named after Rex Jackson, a Grateful Dead roadie and later road manager until his death in 1976.

History 
In the fall of 1983, the Rex Foundation was established as a non-profit charitable organization by members of the Grateful Dead and friends. The Rex Foundation enabled the Grateful Dead to go beyond responding to multiple requests for contributions, and proactively provide extensive community support to creative endeavors in the arts, sciences, and education. The first benefit concerts for the Rex Foundation were held in the spring of 1984 at the Marin Veteran’s Memorial Auditorium. Since 1984 the Rex Foundation has granted $8.2 million to some 1,000 recipients. Virtually all grant recipients are selected through the personal knowledge of decision makers – as a result, grant requests are not solicited. Grants are made once or twice a year.

Mission 
The Rex Foundation's stated mission is "to help secure a healthy environment, promote individuality in the arts, provide support to critical and necessary social services, assist others less fortunate than ourselves, protect the rights of indigenous people and ensure their cultural survival, build a stronger community, and educate children and adults everywhere."

Artists participating (incomplete) 

 Grateful Dead
 Bob Weir
 Mickey Hart
 Phil Lesh
 Donna Jean Godchaux
 Bill Kreutzmann
 The New Riders of the Purple Sage
 Keller Williams
 Grateful Grass (collaboration of Keller Williams, Keith Moseley, and Jeff Austin)
 Dark Star Orchestra
 Zen Tricksters
 Donna Jean and the Tricksters
 moe.
 Tea Leaf Green
 Assembly of Dust
 Ryan Montbleau Band

Beneficiaries 
The Rex Foundation has contributed to:

The Achievement Academy at Simon's Recreation Center
The American Indian College Fund
American Music Theater Festival
Bethesda Project (My Brother's House)
Camp Winnarainbow
The Committee for a Better North Philadelphia
Families Against Mandatory Minimums Foundation
The Family Assistance Program
The Farm School
Fishery Foundation of California
Food and Friends
Greater Philadelphia Food Bank
Hanford Education Action League
Huichol Sierra Fund for Community Development
Lithuanian Basketball Team
Mainstream Foundation
Musicians United for Superior Education
National Handicapped Sports
Native American Women's Health Education Center
O'Neill Sea Odyssey
Peer AIDS Education Coalition
The Poetry Project at St. Marks
Project AVARY
San Quentin Mass Choir
Sunburst Projects (Music from people with HIV/AIDS)
Wave Hill - Putting Children in Touch with Nature
Whitechapel Art Gallery, London - John Virtue Exhibition
United Indians of All Tribes Foundation
Zen Hospice Project

and many others.

Board Members
Bob Weir, Tim Walther, Cameron Sears, Sage Scully, John Scher, Cliff Palefsky, Roger McNamee, Nick Morgan, John Leopold, Michael Klein, Rosalie Howarth, Mickey Hart, Freddy Hahne, Carolyn Garcia, Andy Gadiel, Kristin Dolan, Stefanie Coyote, Barry Caplan, Diane Blagman, Steve Bernstein, Tim Duncan, Dawn Holiday, Jay Caauwe

Bill Graham (1984 – d.1991), Jerry Garcia (1984 – d.1995)

Executive Director
Cameron Sears

Advisory Board
Bill Walton, Jon McIntire, Larry Brilliant, John Perry Barlow (d. 2018), Bernie Bildman, 

EMERITUS: Hal Kant

References

 Rex Foundation History and Mission

Additional sources

External links
 Rex Foundation

Foundations based in the United States
Non-profit organizations based in San Francisco
Arts foundations based in the United States